807 Ceraskia (prov. designation:  or ) is an elongated Eos asteroid from the outer regions of the asteroid belt. It was discovered on 18 April 1915, by German astronomer Max Wolf at the Heidelberg-Königstuhl State Observatory in southwest Germany. It was named after Belarusian–Soviet astronomer Vitold Cerasky (1849–1925).

Orbit and classification 

Ceraskia is a core member the Eos family, the largest asteroid family of the outer main belt consisting of nearly 10,000 known asteroids. It orbits the Sun in the outer asteroid belt at a distance of 2.8–3.2 AU once every 5 years and 3 months (1,913 days; semi-major axis of 3.02 AU). Its orbit has an eccentricity of 0.07 and an inclination of 11° with respect to the ecliptic. The body's observation arc begins at Vienna Observatory on 4 May 1915, or two weeks after its official discovery observation at Heidelberg by Max Wolf.

Naming 

This minor planet was named after Vitold Cerasky (1849–1925), a Belarusian–Soviet astronomer, professor of astronomy at Moscow University and long-time director of the Moscow Observatory . According to Nikolai Chernykh, Cerasky worked extensively on stellar and solar photometry. His name is often transliterated as Vitold Tserasky and Witold Karlovich Ceraski. The lunar crater Tseraskiy is named after him. His wife, Lidiya Tseraskaya (1855–1931), who was also an astronomer, was honored by the crater Tseraskaya on Venus.

The  was incorrect in the previous three editions of Dictionary of Minor Planet Names, which was based on The Names of the Minor Planets by Paul Herget in 1955.

Physical characteristics 

In the Tholen classification, Ceraskia is a common, stony S-type asteroid. In the taxonomic classification based on near-infrared colors from the MOVIS-catalog, the asteroid is a Cgx-subtype that is closest to a carbonaceous C-type and somewhat similar to an uncommon G-type and X-type asteroid. The MOVIS catalog was created from data gather by the VISTA Hemisphere Survey conducted with the VISTA telescope at Paranal Observatory in Chile.

Rotation period 

In October 2017, a rotational lightcurve of Ceraskia was obtained from photometric observations by Matthieu Conjat at Nice Observatory  in France. Lightcurve analysis gave a well-defined rotation period of  hours with a brightness variation of  magnitude.

Lightcurve inversion also modeled the body's shape and poles. In 2013, modelling by an international study using photometric data from the US Naval Observatory, the Uppsala Asteroid Photometric Catalogue, the Palomar Transient Factory and the Catalina Sky Survey gave a concurring sidereal period of  hours and two spin axes of (325.0°, 23.0°) and (132.0°, 26.0°) in ecliptic coordinates (λ, β). The body's very elongated shape had already been indicated by the relatively high brightness variation measured during the direct photometric observations.

Diameter and albedo 

The Collaborative Asteroid Lightcurve Link derives an albedo of 0.1368 and a diameter of 26.15 kilometers based on an absolute magnitude of 10.69.

References

External links 
 Lightcurve Database Query (LCDB), at www.minorplanet.info
 Dictionary of Minor Planet Names, Google books
 Asteroids and comets rotation curves, CdR – Geneva Observatory, Raoul Behrend
 Discovery Circumstances: Numbered Minor Planets (1)-(5000) – Minor Planet Center
 
 

000807
Discoveries by Max Wolf
Named minor planets
000807
19150418